West Peterborough is an unincorporated community in the town of Peterborough in Hillsborough County, New Hampshire, United States. It is located along Nubanusit Brook in the western part of the town.

West Peterborough has a separate ZIP code (03468) from the rest of Peterborough. The community's population, however, is included in the Peterborough census-designated place, comprising the central settled area of the town.

References

Unincorporated communities in Hillsborough County, New Hampshire
Unincorporated communities in New Hampshire